(stylized as GARNiDELiA) is a Japanese pop rock duo, consisting of singer Mai Mizuhashi, better known by her stage name MARiA and Vocaloid record producer , better known by his stage name toku.

History
The duo first collaborated on the song "Color", which was used as the opening theme to the 2010 anime television series Freezing. The name of their unit came from the French phrase "Le Palais Garnier de Maria" (Maria's Opera), and the asteroid Cordelia, which was discovered in 1978, the year of toku's birth.

In 2014, they made their debut under the major record label Defstar Records with the single "ambiguous", which was released on March 5, 2014, whose title track is used as the second opening theme to the 2013 anime television series Kill la Kill. Later that year, MARiA collaborated with Vocaloid producer Jin and performed the song "Daze", which is used as the opening theme to the 2014 anime television series Mekakucity Actors. Their second single "Grilletto", which was released on July 30, 2014, was used as the second opening theme to the anime television series The Irregular at Magic High School. Their third single "Blazing", which was released on October 29, 2014, is used as the first opening theme to the anime television series Gundam Reconguista in G. Their debut album Linkage Ring was released on January 21, 2015.

GARNiDELiA's fourth single "MIRAI", which was released on May 13, 2015, is used as the ending theme to the anime series Gunslinger Stratos. Their indie album Birthia was released on August 26, 2015, which contains remade songs that were made before their debut single, such as "ARiA", "SPiCa", and "ORiON".

Their third digital single "Burning Soul" was released on April 13, 2016. It was used as the theme song for the MMORPG game Soul Worker. Their fifth single , was available digitally 10 days before it was released on August 17, 2016; and was used as the second ending to the anime series Qualidea Code. The B-side to that single, Gokuraku Jodo, received unexpected popularity in China as a dance hit after it was shared onto the video site Bilibili, spoofing various covers. GARNiDELiA collaborated with ClariS in performing the song "Clever" released on September 14, 2016; the song is used as the third ending theme to Qualidea Code. Their second album Violet Cry was released on December 14, 2016.

GARNiDELiA moved to the Sacra Music record label under Sony Music Entertainment Japan in April 2017. Their sixth single "Speed Star" is released on June 14, 2017; the song is used as the ending theme of The Irregular at Magic High School: The Movie – The Girl Who Summons the Stars. Their seventh single "Désir" (Desire) was released on August 23, 2017; the song is used as the ending theme of anime Fate/Apocrypha. Their eighth single  was released on November 1, 2017; the song was used as the opening theme of anime Animegataris.

Their ninth single, "Error" was released digitally on January 27, 2018 and received a physical release on January 31, 2018; the song is used as the opening theme of anime series Beatless. Their third album G.R.N.D. was released on March 28, 2018. Their second compilation eurodance-style album  was released on September 26, 2018; the album contains dance covers by MARiA, Miume, and Niina (217), such as Gokuraku Jodo, Kureha Itoshiuta, Tougen Renka, avra K'davarah, Lamb, Girls, and PiNK CAT.

Their tenth single, "Rebel Flag" was released digitally on January 12, 2019, and received a physical release on March 13, 2019; the song is used as the ending theme of anime series Magical Girl Spec-Ops Asuka. At the end of August 2019, it was announced that they would leave Sacra Music following their contract expiration in 2019. Their last best album under the label, GARNiDELIA BEST, was released on December 12, 2019.

On June 29, 2020, it was announced that GARNiDELiA moved to the label music Universal Music Japan, following the release of their first digital single of their new label "Star Trail". On August 9, 2020, they made a self cover of the song "Gurenge" in their official YouTube; the cover is part of their official cover, titled GARNiDELiA Cover Collection. Their 2nd digital single "Secret Party" was released on September 23. It was used as theme song to their Halloween Party. Their 4th album Kishikaisei was released on November 25, 2020. The album contains 8 brand-new songs along with Secret Party and Star Trail.

Discography

Albums

Studio albums

Best-of albums

Mini albums

Singles

Collaboration singles

Digital singles

GARNiDELiA Cover Collection

References

External links
 

2010 establishments in Japan
Anime musical groups
Defstar Records artists
Japanese Eurodance groups
Japanese idol groups
Musical groups established in 2010
Musical groups from Tokyo
Sacra Music artists
Sony Music Entertainment Japan artists